The 1981–82 Cypriot Third Division was the 11th season of the Cypriot third-level football league. Digenis Akritas Ipsona won their 1st title.

Format
Fourteen teams participated in the 1981–82 Cypriot Third Division. All teams played against each other twice, once at their home and once away. The team with the most points at the end of the season crowned champions. The first two teams were promoted to 1982–83 Cypriot Second Division. The last two teams were relegated to regional leagues.

Point system
Teams received two points for a win, one point for a draw and zero points for a loss.

League standings

Sources

See also
 Cypriot Third Division
 1981–82 Cypriot First Division
 1981–82 Cypriot Cup

Cypriot Third Division seasons
Cyprus
1981–82 in Cypriot football